Xeringinia is a genus of moths belonging to the family Tineidae.

There is only one species in this genus, Xeringinia altilis (Meyrick, 1893) that is restricted to Australia.

References

Meessiinae
Tineidae genera
Monotypic moth genera